The Far North West Sports League was formed as a joint initiative by the Commonwealth and State governments and the SANFL to promote active lifestyles in the APY lands, situated in the far north west corner of South Australia. The FNWSL is an Australian rules football and Softball competition.

History
Formed in 2007, two conferences of four teams were formed. The Eastern conference consisted of Indulkana, Mimili, Anilalya and Pukatja. The Western conference included Fregon, Amata, Murputja and Pipalyatjara. The top two teams of each conference played off for the premiership.

Premierships
2007 Mimili 12.6.78 def Amata 8.5.53
2008 Pukatja 10.4.64 def Mimili 8.6.54
2009 Amata 10.5.65 def Mimili 7.8.50
2010 Mimili 9.5.59 def Fregon 8.8.56
2011 Amata 9.6.60 def Wintjlunga 7.10.52
2012 Pipalyatjara def Fregon
2013 Indulkana def Tjurma
2014 Murputja def Pukatja
2015 Pukatja def Indulkana
2016 Pukatja def Fregon
2017 Tjurma def Amata
2019 Tjurma def Wintjalangu

2013 Ladder

Notable players
 Amos Frank -  selected Frank in the AFL 2012 Rookie Draft at pick 34.

References

External links
 FNWSL Home page- Sporting Pulse
 Country Footy

Books
 Encyclopedia of South Australian country football clubs / compiled by Peter Lines. 
 South Australian country football digest / by Peter Lines 

Australian rules football competitions in South Australia